Hiatus fulvipes is a species of ulidiid or picture-winged fly of the family Ulidiidae, the only species of the genus Hiatus.

References

Otitinae